Honda Yasushige may refer to:

Honda Yasushige (1554-1611), daimyō of Okazaki Domain
Honda Yasushige (Zeze) (1836–1912), daimyō of Zeze Domain

See also
Honda clan